Hiiragi may refer to:

Hiiragi, an evergreen shrub or small tree
Hiiragi (song), a single by Do As Infinity, a Japanese band
Hiiragi (surname)